The Lower East Side of Life is the second studio album to be released by American singer Eric Heatherly. It was released in 2005, after Heatherly had recorded two unreleased albums on two different labels. The album was released on Heatherly's personal label, NashVegas Records, in association with Koch Entertainment, and no singles were released from it.

Critical reception
Country Standard Time describes the album as containing "honest country songs."

Track listing

Musical credits
José Arbelaez - organ, synthesizer, piano, drums, percussion
Eric Darken - percussion
Eric Heatherly - lead vocals, background vocals, electric guitar, acoustic guitar, bass guitar, mandolin, Hammond organ, synthesizer, harmonica
Chris McHugh - drums
Greg Morrow - drums

References

2005 albums
Eric Heatherly albums
E1 Music albums